Henry Corrales (born August 11, 1986), is an American mixed martial artist currently competing in the Featherweight division of Bellator MMA. A professional since 2011, he has also competed for King of the Cage, where he is the former Featherweight and Bantamweight Champion.

Background
Born in Moraga, California and raised in La Mirada, California, Corrales attended La Mirada High School. Growing up in rough neighborhoods, Corrales got into street fights constantly and eventually participated in a mixed martial arts bout at the age of 23.

Mixed martial arts career

Early career
Corrales made his professional debut in the spring of 2011, winning his first six fights before being given a title shot for the King of the Cage Featherweight Championship. Corrales won via split decision, and defended his title once before dropping down to the Bantamweight division. He defeated then-KOTC Bantamweight Champion Alejandro Garcia at KOTC: Slugfest on June 5, 2014 to hold both titles. 

Corrales defended each title once more before signing with Bellator MMA in mid-2015.

Bellator MMA
Corrales made his promotional debut at Bellator 138 on June 19, 2015 against former Bellator Featherweight Champion Daniel Straus. He was defeated in the second round via submission, and handed his first professional loss.

His next bout came against Emmanuel Sanchez at Bellator 143 on September 25, 2015. He was defeated by split decision. 

Corrales faced former Bellator Featherweight champion Patrício Freire at Bellator 153 on April 22, 2016, stepping in at the last minute to replace an injured John Teixeira. Corrales was defeated via third-round submission. 

Corrales was scheduled to meet rising prospect A.J. McKee at Bellator 160 on August 26, 2016. However, the bout was scrapped when Corrales announced he was injured.

Corrales returned to face Cody Bollinger at Bellator 170 on January 21, 2017. He won the bout via second-round TKO, picking up his first Bellator victory in the process. He then picked up three consecutive wins before being matched up with former Olympic wrestler and touted MMA prospect Aaron Pico at Bellator 214 on January 26, 2019. In a thrilling but quick bout, Corrales was knocked down early by Pico but was able to come back and knock Pico out with a right hook from the clinch.

Bellator Featherweight Grand Prix
After the big win over Pico which brought his win streak to five, Corrales faced former Bellator Bantamweight Champion Darrion Caldwell at Bellator 228 in the opening round of the Bellator Featherweight World Grand Prix on September 28, 2019. Corrales was defeated via unanimous decision.

Post-GP reign
Corrales next faced Juan Archuleta at Bellator 238 on January 25, 2020. He lost the fight by unanimous decision.

Corrales faced Brandon Girtz at Bellator 250 on October 29, 2020. He won the fight via split decision.  Following the bout, Corrales announced his intentions to return to the bantamweight division.

Corrales was scheduled to make his return to bantamweight against Keith Lee at Bellator 258 on May 7, 2021. However, Lee pulled out of the bout and was replaced by Johnny Campbell. In an upset, Corrales lost the bout via rear-naked choke submission after getting dropped in the second round.

Corrales faced Vladyslav Parubchenko on October 16, 2021 at Bellator 268. He won the fight via unanimous decision.

As the last bout of his prevailing contract, Corrales faced Aiden Lee on January 29, 2022 at Bellator 273. After an accidental eyepoke in the third round rendered Lee unable to continue, the bout went to the judges who scored the bout an unanimous decision victory for Corrales.

Corrales faced Akhmed Magomedov on February 4, 2023 at Bellator 290. He won the bout via unanimous decision.

Championships and accomplishments
King of the Cage
KOTC Featherweight Championship (One time)
Two successful title defenses
KOTC Bantamweight Championship (One time)
One successful title defense

Mixed martial arts record

|-
|Win
|align=center|21–6
|Akhmed Magomedov
|Decision (unanimous)
|Bellator 290
|
|align=center|3
|align=center|5:00
|Inglewood, California, United States
|
|-
|Win
|align=center|20–6
|Aiden Lee
|Technical Decision (unanimous)
|Bellator 273
|
|align=center|3
|align=center|0:41
|Phoenix, Arizona, United States
|
|-
|Win
|align=center|19–6
|Vladyslav Parubchenko	
|Decision (unanimous)
|Bellator 268 
|
|align=center|3
|align=center|5:00
|Phoenix, Arizona, United States 
|
|-
|Loss
|align=center| 18–6
|Johnny Campbell
|Submission (rear-naked choke)
|Bellator 258
|
|align=center|2
|align=center|4:12
|Uncasville, Connecticut, United States
|
|-
|Win
|align=center|18–5
|Brandon Girtz
|Decision (split)
|Bellator 250
|
|align=center|3
|align=center|5:00
|Uncasville, Connecticut, United States
|
|-
|Loss
|align=center| 17–5
|Juan Archuleta
|Decision (unanimous)
|Bellator 238
|
|align=center|3
|align=center|5:00
|Inglewood, California, United States
|
|-
|Loss
|align=center| 17–4
|Darrion Caldwell
|Decision (unanimous)
|Bellator 228
|
|align=center|3
|align=center|5:00
|Inglewood, California, United States
|
|-
|Win
|align=center| 17–3
|Aaron Pico
|KO (punches)
|Bellator 214
|
|align=center|1
|align=center|1:07
|Inglewood, California, United States
|
|-
|Win
|align=center| 16–3
|Andy Main
|TKO (punches)
|Bellator 208
|
|align=center|3
|align=center|2:08
|Uniondale, New York, United States
|
|-
| Win
| align=center| 15–3
| Georgi Karakhanyan
| Decision (unanimous)
| Bellator 192
| 
| align=center| 3
| align=center| 5:00
| Inglewood, California, United States
| 
|-
| Win
| align=center| 14–3
| Noad Lahat
| Decision (unanimous)
| Bellator 182
| 
| align=center| 3
| align=center| 5:00
| Verona, New York, United States
| 
|-
| Win
| align=center| 13–3
| Cody Bollinger
| TKO (body punch)
| Bellator 170
| 
| align=center| 3
| align=center| 4:28
| Inglewood, California, United States
| 
|-
| Loss
| align=center| 12–3
| Patrício Pitbull
| Submission (guillotine choke)
| Bellator 153
| 
| align=center| 2
| align=center| 4:09
| Uncasville, Connecticut, United States
| 
|-
| Loss
| align=center| 12–2
| Emmanuel Sanchez
| Decision (split)
| Bellator 143
| 
| align=center| 3
| align=center| 5:00
| Hidalgo, Texas, United States
| 
|-
| Loss 
| align=center| 12–1
| Daniel Straus
| Submission (guillotine choke)
| Bellator 138
| 
| align=center| 2
| align=center| 3:47
| St. Louis, Missouri, United States
|
|-
| Win
| align=center| 12–0
| Aaron Neveu
| KO (punch)
| KOTC: Coming Home
| 
| align=center| 2
| align=center| 0:43
| San Jacinto, California, United States
|
|-
| Win
| align=center| 11–0
| Seth Dikun
| Submission (guillotine choke)
| KOTC: Battle for the Belt
| 
| align=center| 2
| align=center| 2:29
| Highland, California, United States
|
|-
| Win
| align=center| 10–0
| Alejandro Garcia
| TKO (doctor stoppage)
| KOTC: Slugfest
| 
| align=center| 2
| align=center| 0:40
| Highland, California, United States
|
|-
| Win
| align=center| 9–0
| Seth Dikun
| TKO (doctor stoppage)
|  KOTC: Beaten Path
| 
| align=center| 3
| align=center| 5:00
| Highland, California, United States
|
|-
| Win
| align=center| 8–0
| Jerod Spoon
| Decision (split)
| KOTC: Terrified 
| 
| align=center| 5
| align=center| 5:00
| Highland, California, United States
|
|-
| Win
| align=center| 7–0
| Gustavo Limon
| KO
| KOTC: Split Decision 
| 
| align=center| 1
| align=center| 0:20
| Highland, California, United States
| 
|-
| Win
| align=center| 6–0
| Cooper Gibson
| Decision (unanimous)
| KOTC: Validation
| 
| align=center| 3
| align=center| 5:00
| Highland, California, United States
| 
|-
| Win
| align=center| 5–0
| Mike Christensen
| Submission (kimura)
| KOTC: Devastation 
| 
| align=center| 2
| align=center| 3:02
| Highland, California, United States
|
|-
| Win
| align=center| 4–0
| Steve Crosby
| Submission (keylock)
| Gladiator Challenge: Holiday Beatings
| 
| align=center| 1
| align=center| N/A
| San Jacinto, California, United States
| 
|-
| Win
| align=center| 3–0
| Max Ceniceros
| Submission (guillotine choke)
| Long Beach Fight Night 14
| 
| align=center| 2
| align=center| 1:16
| Long Beach, California, United States
|  
|-
| Win
| align=center| 2–0
| Ruben Rosas
| Submission (armbar)
| Long Beach Fight Night 13
| 
| align=center| 2
| align=center| 2:50
| Long Beach, California, United States
| 
|-
| Win
| align=center| 1–0
| Emilio Gonzales
| Submission (rear-naked choke) 
| Long Beach Fight Night 12
| 
| align=center| 1
| align=center| 2:40
| Long Beach, California, United States
|

See also
 List of current Bellator fighters

References

External links
 

1986 births
Living people
American mixed martial artists of Mexican descent
American male mixed martial artists
Mixed martial artists from California
Featherweight mixed martial artists
Bantamweight mixed martial artists